Leonore Gewessler (born 15 September 1977) is an Austrian Green politician serving as Minister of Climate Action, Environment, Energy, Mobility, Innovation and Technology in the government of Chancellor Sebastian Kurz and later Alexander Schallenberg since January 2020.

Early life

Education
Gewessler earned her political science degree (BA) from the University of Vienna.

Political career
From 2014 until 2019, Gewessler served as head of Austria's largest environmental charity and lobbying group Global 2000. In this capacity, she championed a popular campaign against the expansion of the ageing Soviet-era Mochovce nuclear power plant in neighbouring Slovakia, just 100 km from the Austrian border.

In the negotiations on a coalition government following the 2019 national elections, Gewessler was a member of the Green Party’s delegation.

References

External links 
Leonore Gewessler on the Austrian Parliament website

Living people
1977 births
Politicians from Graz
Government ministers of Austria
Women government ministers of Austria
21st-century Austrian women politicians
21st-century Austrian politicians
The Greens – The Green Alternative politicians
Austrian environmentalists
University of Vienna alumni